Sir Kenneth Lloyd Jones  is a British former police officer. He was a Deputy Commissioner of Victoria Police in Australia, former President of Association of Chief Police Officers for England, Wales and Northern Ireland in the United Kingdom and Senior Investigator of Independent Commission Against Corruption (ICAC) of Hong Kong. Sir Ken Jones is a former President of Association of Chief Police Officers and presently defence & security advisor at the British Embassy in Washington DC. He was awarded the Queen's Police Medal in 2000 and was knighted for services to policing in 2009.

Early life and education
Jones was born in Wales and completed BA (Hons) in 1985. He did his MBA in 1992. In 1996, he won a Fulbright Scholarship to study policing in the United States and was an associate professor at UCLA.

Career
With South Yorkshire Police, Jones served in a number of cities including Sheffield, Rotherham, Barnsley and Doncaster gaining experience with community beat duties, specialist detective work and the use of firearms. Whilst there he received three Chief Constable's Commendations.
He has commanded both rural and urban divisions. He gained experience abroad working as an anti corruption investigator in Hong Kong and as an election monitor in Zimbabwe. he visited the West Coast of the United States to study the growth of private policing.

Sir Ken has also served in Africa (Zimbabwe-Rhodesia), the United States (as a Fulbright Scholar at UCLA in 1996) and Hong Kong (in the Independent Commission Against Corruption (ICAC)). He was appointed Assistant Chief Constable of the Avon and Somerset Constabulary in 1997.

Chief constable in Sussex
In November 2001 he was promoted to Chief Constable of Sussex Police, serving until 2006.

President of ACPO
In 2006, Jones became the President of the Association of Chief Police Officers ACPO He was preceded by Sir Chris Fox QPM (2003–2006) and followed by Sir Hugh Orde OBE.

Deputy Commissioner of Victoria Police
On 25 May 2009 it was announced that he had been appointed as the Deputy Commissioner (Crime) for Victoria Police in Australia. He assumed the duties of this role on 1 July 2009.

Positions held
 World Regional Chair of the International Association of Chiefs of Police.
 Chief Constable – Sussex Police.  
 Chief Constable and President – Association of Chief Police Officers England, Wales, Northern Ireland. 
 Deputy Commissioner ( Crime ) – Victoria Police, Victoria, Australia.  
 Chair of the Sussex Criminal Justice Board.  
 Chair and Member of the ACPO's Terrorism & Allied Matters (TAM), London. 
 Board Member of National Policing Improvement Agency (NPIA).
 Board Member of National Policing Board (NPB). 
 Board Member of the National Criminal Justice Board.
 Board Member ( and occasional chair ) of HMIC's Senior Appointment's Panel. 
 Board Member (represented UK) on IACP in USA ( as well as World Regional Chair ) .
 Defence & Security Advisor – British Embassy, Washington DC.
 Senior Investigator at Independent Commission Against Corruption (ICAC) Hong Kong.

Awards and accolades
Sir Ken received the Queen's Police Medal in 2001 and was created a Knight in the 2009 New Year honours list.

Death threats
In December 2010, it was revealed that Jones had received a number of death threats, and had been issued with a Glock pistol for protection.

Media
During the time Sir Ken Jones served Victoria Police Force he became the subject of death threats which came to public light in December 2010. 

This signalled the start of the complicated relationship at the top of Victoria Police concerning the integrity of the presentation of crime statistics to the public between Jones and Chief Commissioner Simon Overland. Concerns have been raised about Overland's actions as there is an ongoing investigation into allegations of Overland's own conduct with the former Brumby government, in particular the release of incomplete favorable crime statistics prior to the 2010 election. 

Jones had objected to this politicisation of policing. Jones was reportedly the subject of an investigation by the Office of Police Integrity requested by Overland, over Overland's suspicions that he helped media expose the cherry-picked crime statistics. However these reports were found to be untrue and harmful to Sir Ken Jones' career in a report published by the Ombudsman. IBAC Press release, para 5: "Mr Kellam’s review concluded that the evidence available to OPI and set out in OPI’s final investigation report to the Ombudsman did not support an allegation that Sir Ken Jones QPM had engaged in serious misconduct by leaking or facilitating leaking to the media of confidential police information". This final report cleared Jones of any wrongdoing during his time at Victoria Police Force.

References

External links
Sir Ken Jones QPM ACPO President National Policing Improvement Agency

Year of birth missing (living people)
Living people
Australian police officers
British Chief Constables
Knights Bachelor
Welsh recipients of the Queen's Police Medal
Alumni of the University of Sheffield